Linucula hartvigiana, commonly known as clam nut or nut shell, is a bivalve mollusc. Linucula hartvigiana has a brown oval shell and grows up to 6-8mm in width. Linucula hartvigiana is found in unpolluted subtidal and intertidal muddy-sand habitats throughout New Zealand.

References 

Nuculidae
Bivalves of New Zealand
Molluscs described in 1864